Howard Nelson may refer to:

 Howard Nelson (ecologist), Trinidadian ecologist and wildlife biologist
 Howard Nelson (actor), English film actor
 Howard I. Nelson, American businessman and politician